Cho Gue-sung (born 25 January 1998) is a South Korean footballer who plays as forward for Jeonbuk Hyundai Motors and the South Korea national team.

Club career
Cho played as a defensive midfielder during his youth career and his freshman year at Gwangju University. However, Cho wasn't evaluated as a good midfielder by his university's manager Lee Seung-won, and changed his role to a striker in 2017.

In 2019, Cho joined K League 2 side FC Anyang where he played as a youth player before. He was selected for the K League 2 Best XI by becoming the third top goalscorer in his first professional season, and transferred to K League 1 club Jeonbuk Hyundai Motors the next year.

Cho had difficulty in proving his worth during his first season at Jeonbuk. In 2021, he enlisted in military team Gimcheon Sangmu to serve his military duty and get his stable spot. As a result, he developed physically and technically while being trained at Gimcheon. He became the top goalscorer in the 2022 K League 1 and led Jeonbuk to the 2022 Korean FA Cup title.

In January 2023, Jeonbuk received bids for Cho from Scottish Premiership club Celtic and Major League Soccer side Minnesota United. He was also the subject of interest from Bundesliga side Mainz 05.

International career
Cho made his senior debut for South Korea on 7 September 2021 in a World Cup qualifier against Lebanon. 

In November 2022, Cho was named to the 26-man squad for the 2022 FIFA World Cup. In Korea's second match at the tournament, he scored two goals against Ghana in an eventual 2–3 defeat, becoming the first South Korean player to ever score 2 or more goals in a single World Cup match. Despite losing that match, the goals proved decisive in ultimately sending Korea through to the Round of 16 on goal difference, at the expense of Uruguay.

Due to his performance in 2022 FIFA World Cup, Cho proved to be one of the greatest players in the air in Qatar. The young Korean forward won 21 aerial duels, putting him second in terms of success in the air among all players at the World Cup, after Morocco’s Youssef En-Nesyri.

Career statistics

Club

International

Scores and results list South Korea's goal tally first, score column indicates score after each Cho goal.

Honours
Jeonbuk Hyundai Motors
K League 1: 2020
Korean FA Cup: 2020, 2022

Gimcheon Sangmu
K League 2: 2021

South Korea U23
AFC U-23 Championship: 2020

South Korea
EAFF Championship runner-up: 2022

Individual
K League 2 Best XI: 2019
Korean FA Goal of the Year: 2020
K League 1 top goalscorer: 2022
K League 1 Best XI: 2022
Korean FA Cup Most Valuable Player: 2022

Notes

References

External links

Cho Gue-sung at KFA 

1998 births
Living people
Association football forwards
South Korean footballers
South Korea under-23 international footballers
South Korea international footballers
FC Anyang players
Jeonbuk Hyundai Motors players
Gimcheon Sangmu FC players
K League 1 players
K League 2 players
People from Ansan
Sportspeople from Gyeonggi Province
2022 FIFA World Cup players